The Libertador General San Martín Bridge is a cantilever road bridge that crosses the Uruguay River and joins Argentina and Uruguay.

Studies for the construction of a bridge over the Uruguay River were started in 1960 by a joint commission, which decided that the best place for it would be between Puerto Unzué and Fray Bentos. In 1967 the two countries signed an agreement ratifying the location, and in 1972 the construction contract was awarded to the International Bridge Consortium (Consorcio Puente Internacional), setting the cost at $ 21.7 million, then adjusted upwards.

The bridge is named after José de San Martín, a major figure in the struggle for independence in Argentina, Chile and Peru. It was officially inaugurated on September 16, 1976. It was opened for public use and the next day it started functioning under a toll regime.

See also
 General Artigas Bridge
 Salto Grande Bridge
 Cellulose plant conflict between Argentina and Uruguay

References
 Puentes sobre el Río Uruguay (in Spanish)

External links

Bridges in Argentina
Bridges in Uruguay
Buildings and structures in Entre Ríos Province
Buildings and structures in Río Negro Department
Toll bridges
Bridges completed in 1976
Argentina–Uruguay border crossings
International bridges
Bridges over the Uruguay River
Gualeguaychú, Entre Ríos
Fray Bentos
1976 establishments in Argentina
1976 establishments in Uruguay
Cantilever bridges